The Fort de Goede Hoop ('Fort of Good Hope') was the first military building to be erected in what is now Cape Town.  It was built in 1652, and was in use until 1674 when it was superseded by the Castle of Good Hope.

History 

The Fort was built by the Dutch East India Company, when it established a replenishment station under Jan van Riebeeck on the shore of Table Bay in 1652.  Constructed of earth and timber, it was square, with a pointed bastion at each corner.  The bastions were named Drommedaris, Walvisch, Oliphant, and Reijger. The bastions were named after the ships in Van Riebeeck's fleet.

Within the Fort were living quarters, kitchens, a council chamber (which was also used for church services), a sick bay, workshops, and storerooms. Cannons were placed on the ramparts.  A nearby stream was diverted and channeled to form a moat around the fort.  Being built of earth, the Fort needed frequent maintenance and repairs, especially after heavy rains.

In January 1666, work began on a stone fortress to replace the Fort.  It took eight years to build, and it was not until 1674 that it was ready for occupation.  On 2 May 1674, the council resolved to demolish the Fort, except for some stores which were retained for a while longer, until their contents had been moved into the Castle.

The Fort is sometimes confused with the Redoubt Duijnhoop, which was built some distance away, at the mouth of the Salt River, in 1654.

In 1732 it was erected the first Masonic lodge in South Africa, Lodge De Goede Hoop, which was a branch of the Premier Grand Lodge of England.

See also
 Castle of Good Hope
 Fortifications of the Cape Peninsula
 Redout Duijnhoop
 List of Castles and Fortifications in South Africa

Footnotes

References

 Emms, M.  'Fortifications of the Cape of Good Hope' in Lantern (June 1976).
 
 

History of Cape Town
Military history of South Africa
Goede Hoop
1652 establishments in the Dutch Empire